West Side Community Concerts, Inc., renamed West Side Orchestral Concerts, Inc. in 1968, were an American summer classical concert series given by a 40-piece orchestra, The Festival Symphony Orchestra.  The series debuted in the summer of 1962 and continued until 1977. Frédérique Petrides (1903–1983) was its founder, organizer and musical director.  The first concert in 1962, took place at 73rd Street, in Riverside Park, but in 1963 the series moved to its permanent location, a spacious sports arena, with the Hudson River as a backdrop, at 103rd Street in Riverside Park, Manhattan, New York, where, for the concerts, a temporary acoustical shell was brought in.  The series was publicized and referred to as "Tanglewood around the corner". The concerts were well received by the press, attended by as many as 4,500, and broadcast live on WNYC radio.

Founder and conductor, Frédérique Petrides
Prior to founding the West Side Community Concerts/West Side Orchestral Concerts, Frédérique Petrides, a pioneer in her field, had founded the Orchestrette Classique, an all-women's chamber orchestra, which existed from 1932 to 1943, premiered works by new American composers, such as Paul Creston, Samuel Barber and David Diamond; and gave five to six concerts annually in Carnegie chamber Music Hall, now Weill Recital Hall, founded the Carl Schurz Park concert series on Manhattan's Upper East Side in 1958, founded the Hudson Valley Symphony Orchestra in Tarrytown, New York in the 1930s, and founded the Student Symphony Society in New York City in 1950. Petrides was also editor and publisher of the Women in Music newsletters, that, in the 1930s, were published in New York and circulated internationally.

An eye for possibilities
Petrides launched and directed two separate outdoor summer orchestra festivals, both in Manhattan neighborhoods where she lived.   The first series, begun in 1958, was in Carl Schurz Park on the Upper East Side, adjacent to East End Avenue, where she had lived from 1931 to 1958.  The second, West Side Community Concerts was launched in 1962, in Riverside Park on the Upper West Side, close to West 78th Street, where she lived from 1958 to 1983.

The Festival Symphony Orchestra 
It was for the Carl Schurz Park concerts, near Gracie Mansion, that Frédérique Petrides first organized and directed her Festival Symphony Orchestra, composed primarily of members of the New York Philharmonic. This continued to be her orchestra as leader of the West Side Community Concerts/West Side Orchestral Concerts series.

About the musicians
Petrides had this to say:
"I had very fine musicians to work with."

"It was necessary to be well-organized because there was only limited time to rehearse. I talked very little but would get down to the business of rehearsing immediately. A woman must be better than a man if she is to conduct prestigious groups, and I made it my career always to be 100 percent prepared and know all the scores tremendously well. I never encountered a problem conducting all-male orchestras, and we always worked well together."

The organization 
The concerts were presented under the auspices of "West Side Community Concerts, Inc."  and then "West Side Orchestral Concerts, Inc."
The musicians were funded, in part, by a grant from The Recording Industries Trust Fund, obtained with assistance from Local 802 of the American Federation of Musicians.
The New York City Department of Parks coordinated efforts with West Side Community Concerts/West Side Orchestral Concerts.
Harry B. Frank (1905–1996) of the New York Supreme Court served as Founding Chairman of the organization. Gladys Steinholz ( Garf; 1901–1967) later served as Chairman.

Publicist and manager, Peter Petrides

For more than forty years, Frédérique Petrides' conducting career was abetted by her husband, journalist, Peter Petrides (1896–1978), who acted as manager and publicist for the concerts.  He was born Petros Agathangelos Petrides into a Greek family in Caratepeh, Turkey and grew up in Constantinople. After emigrating to the United States, as a young man, he became a writer for and Managing Editor of the Greek-American newspaper, The National Herald (not to be mistaken for the newspaper of the same name that was established in 1997). " I could never have done [my] work without his continuous help and encouragement...He was a wonderful Publicity Man, full of creative ideas..." Frédérique Petrides

Combining the old with the new
"Madame Frédérique Petrides is a telented and dedicated pioneer conductor. She has the breadth and depth of knowledge and perceptive ability to delve into little - known scores and present new and different listening experiences.   That she was able to combine in her programs new music with little - known classical compositions made a unique contribution to the American musical scene. Why would a conductor  choose this direction? She [Petrides] answers,

'I needed to attract attention in order to receive the support of a listening public as well as support from the higher echelon in the music circle of fine musicians and critics. There was a wealth of music on library shelves and it had not been explored.  There were works by classical composers and these had never been performed in America. Modern works needed public performances, too. People are instinctively attracted to new listening experiences--how else can there be musical growth? I continually accomplished this goal by offering something different.'"

Press
Among the leading critics who, during the fifteen years of its existence, closely followed and reviewed the West Side Community Concerts/West Side Orchestral Concerts series were Francis D. Perkins of the New York Herald Tribune, Howard Klein, Theodore Strongin  and  Raymond Ericson of The New York Times; and Robert Sherman, also with The New York Times, who in the July 3, 1970 edition of that paper wrote of Frédérique Petrides as  "a prime mover in New York's cultural affairs since the mid-thirties".

Notable concert in memoriam 
 June 14, 1965 — The Festival Orchestra with choir performed Haydn's Mass in Time of War in memory of Andrew Goodman, a young West Sider who was killed in Neshoba County, Mississippi.  His friends, civil rights coworkers, and family were in an audience of about 2,000.

Images, and guide to papers
Frédérique Petrides Photos New York Public Library

Frédérique Petrides Papers New York Public Library

References 

Music festivals established in 1968
Classical music festivals in the United States
Recurring events established in 1961
Musical groups established in 1961
Culture of New York City
Orchestral music
1961 establishments in New York City